Peter Jason Maguire (born 11 September 1969) is a former professional footballer, born in Holmfirth, West Yorkshire, who played as a striker in the Football League for Leeds United, Huddersfield Town and Stockport County. He also played for Swedish club IFK Osby (on loan), and Emley F.C., a Yorkshire-based English Non League club, and in both the Scottish Highland Football League, and then the Scottish Football League with Elgin City F.C. when Elgin were promoted in 2000 from the Highland Football League to the Scottish Football League, and subsequently with Forres Mechanics F.C., and Lossiemouth F.C., both Scottish Highland Football League clubs.

Notes
A.  Figures for Scottish League games only.

References

External links
  (Scottish clubs)
 League stats at Neil Brown's site

1969 births
Living people
English footballers
People from Holmfirth
Association football forwards
Leeds United F.C. players
Huddersfield Town A.F.C. players
Stockport County F.C. players
Elgin City F.C. players
English Football League players
Scottish Football League players
Forres Mechanics F.C. players
Lossiemouth F.C. players
Sportspeople from Yorkshire
Wakefield F.C. players